Awais Qasim Khan is a Pakistani politician who was a Member of the Provincial Assembly of the Punjab, from 2008 to May 2018.

Early life and education
He was born on 19 August 1969 in Sialkot.

He completed his graduation from Forman Christian College in 1989 and has a degree of Bachelor of Arts.

Political career

He ran for the seat of the Provincial Assembly of the Punjab as a candidate of Pakistan Muslim League (Q) (PML-Q) from Constituency PP-132 (Narowal-I) in 2002 Pakistani general election. He received 14,835 votes and lost the seat to Syed Saeed ul Hassan, an independent candidate.

He was elected to the Provincial Assembly of the Punjab as a candidate of Pakistan Muslim League (N) (PML-N) from Constituency PP-132 (Narowal-I) in 2008 Pakistani general election. He received 33,382 votes and defeated Syed Saeed ul Hassan Shah, a candidate of PML-Q.

He was re-elected to the Provincial Assembly of the Punjab as a candidate of PML-N from Constituency PP-132 (Narowal-I) in 2013 Pakistani general election. He received 45,505 votes and defeated an independent candidate, Syed Saeed ul Hassan Shah.

In May 2018, he quit PML-N and joined Pakistan Tehreek-e-Insaf (PTI).

References

Living people
Punjab MPAs 2013–2018
1969 births
Pakistan Muslim League (N) politicians
Politicians from Sialkot
Forman Christian College alumni
Punjab MPAs 2008–2013